The West Australian Screen Awards (WASA) are film awards given out in Western Australia. The WASAs are presented by FTI (WA). 

The Awards commenced in 1987, although they were put on hold for a year in 2012, before running again from 2013 to 2016, when it was finally cancelled.

The awards were significant points in the careers of a number of Australian film stars and film companies.

The awards have now evolved into the WA Screen Culture Awards which commenced in 2020.

See also
Film Industry in Western Australia
Cinema of Australia

References

External links
The West Australian Screen Awards
 

Film organisations in Australia
Culture of Western Australia